Andreas Avraam (born 6 June 1987) is a Cypriot professional footballer who plays as a left back.

Career
He is also a member of the Cyprus national team and has captained the Cyprus U-19. He grew as a player in the Omonia Aradippou in Second Division of Cyprus academies. Apollon Limassol scouter's found this talent signed him for a fee of 55.000 euros. AC Omonia paid Apollon Limassol 850.000 euros to bring the player to their team. He is a very gifted left winger with good crossing and scoring capabilities. His excellent appearances have sparked interests in both domestic and foreign clubs, particularly in Greece.

Honours

AEL Limassol
Cypriot Cup: 2019

Apollon Limassol
Cypriot Cup: 2010

Omonia
Cypriot Cup: 2011, 2012
Cyprus FA Shield: 2010, 2012

International goals
Scores and results list Cyprus' goal tally first.

References

External links

1987 births
Living people
People from Larnaca
Cypriot footballers
Cyprus international footballers
Cyprus under-21 international footballers
Cypriot First Division players
Super League Greece players
Apollon Limassol FC players
AC Omonia players
Anorthosis Famagusta F.C. players
Athlitiki Enosi Larissa F.C. players
AEL Limassol players
Expatriate footballers in Greece
Cypriot expatriate sportspeople in Greece
Association football wingers